TV Gelderland is a regional public TV station for the Dutch province of Gelderland. Omroep Gelderland launched its channel in 1996. The regional news bulletin called TV Gelderland Nieuws is broadcast daily live at 13.00 and 18:00, repeated every hour.

TV Gelderland can be received free-to-air on the Digital Terrestrial Television platform Digitenne. It's also available on cable, satellite, IPTV, Fiber-to-the-home platforms and on the Internet.

See also
 Netherlands Public Broadcasting
 Television in the Netherlands

References

External links
 Omroep Gelderland website (Mobile) 

Television channels in the Netherlands
Television channels and stations established in 1996
Netherlands Public Broadcasting